The mixed team competition of the Golf events at the 2019 Pan American Games was held between August 8 and 11 at the Country Club Villa in Lima, Peru. The team score for each round was the sum of the low men's score and the low women's score.

The all-amateur team from the United States won the gold medal by five strokes over Paraguay.

Schedule
All times are PET (UTC−5).

Results
The final results were:

M = men, W = women, a = amateur

References

Golf at the 2019 Pan American Games